La signora gioca bene a scopa?, internationally released as Poker in Bed, is a 1974 commedia sexy all'italiana directed by Giuliano Carnimeo.

Plot    
Michele, owner of a shoe store in Parma, is an avid but unlucky poker player: to repay his debts, he decides to become a prostitute

Cast 
 Edwige Fenech as Eva
 Carlo Giuffrè as Michele Cammagliulo
 Carlo Delle Piane as Tonino
 Oreste Lionello as Alberto
 Enzo Cannavale as Peppino
 Franca Valeri as Giulia Nascimbeni
 Didi Perego as Monica
 Gigi Ballista as Gervasio Caminata
 Lia Tanzi as Marisa 
 Enzo Andronico as the Doctor

See also    
 List of Italian films of 1974

References

External links

1974 films
Commedia sexy all'italiana
Films directed by Giuliano Carnimeo
1970s sex comedy films
Films scored by Alessandro Alessandroni
1974 comedy films
1970s Italian films